The University Athletic Association of the Philippines Football Championship is usually held during the second semester of the school year (December–April).

Tournament format
The tournament has three divisions: men, women and boys. As of season 77 (2014–15), eight member universities field a team in the men's division and five in the women's division. The number of participating schools increased to eight from seven in the men's division. Adamson University fielded a men's team in Season 77 (2014–15). Adamson made its return in men's football after more than a decade of absence. While in the boys division, five member universities field a team: the Ateneo de Manila University, the De La Salle University, the Far Eastern University, the University of Santo Tomas and the National University. The number of participating schools increased to five from the four teams of season 79. NU fielded a team starting season 80. 

In the men's division, the top four teams by the end of the double round-robin elimination will advance to the semi-final round. The number one seeded team will face the fourth-seeded team, while the second and third seeded teams will face each other in a one-game match. The winners in the semi-final round face each other in a one-game final match. In the event that a team sweeps all the games during the eliminations, it will automatically qualify for the final. The second, third and fourth seeded teams will face each other in a step-ladder format. The winner will face the number one seeded team in the final.

In the women's and boys' divisions, the top two teams at the end of the second round will face each other in a one-game final. In the event that a team sweeps all the games during the eliminations, that team will have a twice-to-beat advantage in the final.

List of champions
Boys' football was introduced as a demonstration sport in UAAP Season 70 (2007–08) and elevated to a regular sport in UAAP Season 72 (2009–10).

Notes: 
 De La Salle University and University of Santo Tomas were declared as co-champions in Season 54 after a fight broke out between both schools near the end of the match.

Number of championships by school

Statistics
 Longest Championship Streak
 Men's - Ateneo from 2003–2005
 Women's - DLSU from 2002–2005
 Boys'- FEU from 2010–2020
 Double Crown
FEU won the first "double crown" in 2007-08.
UP won its first double crown in 2015-16
 Triple Crown
FEU won "triple crown" in 2013-14 and 2014-15.
Most Finals Appearance
Men's - Ateneo de Manila University - 22 Times
Women's - Far Eastern University - 21 Times
Most Finals Appearance for Two Teams
Men's - Ateneo de Manila University vs. University of Santo Tomas - 9 Times
Women's - De La Salle University vs. Far Eastern University - 9 Times
Longest Finals Appearance
Men's - Ateneo de Manila University - 10 Years - Season 45-Season 54 (1983-1992)
Women's - Far Eastern University - 20 Years - Season 47-Season 66 (1985-2004)
Longest Finals Appearance for Two Teams
Men's - Tied
Ateneo de Manila University vs. Far Eastern University - 5 Years - Season 45-Season 49 (1983-1987)
Ateneo de Manila University vs. University of Santo Tomas - 5 Years - Season 50-Season 54 (1988-1992)
Women's - De La Salle University vs. Far Eastern University - 9 Years - Season 58-Season 66 (1996-2004)
Ranking of the Team with the Most Finals Appearances Combined:
1st - Ateneo de Manila University - 28 Times
2nd - Far Eastern University - 27 Times
3rd - University of Santo Tomas - 25 Times
4th - De La Salle University - 17 Times
5th - University of the Philippines - 14 Times
6th - University of the East - 2 Times

Rankings
Men's final rankings since UAAP Season 64 (2001-2002)

See also
NCAA Philippines Football Championship

References

Football competitions in the Philippines
Football
College association football in the Philippines